Syndestructible is a studio album by The Syn, released in 2005 on Umbrello Records.

Track listing
"Breaking Down Walls" (Nardelli, Squire, P. Stacey) - 0:52
"Some Time, Some Way" (Nardelli, Squire, P. Stacey, Johnson) - 7:56
"Reach Outro" (Nardelli, Squire, P. Stacey, Johnson) - 3:38
"Cathedral of Love" (Nardelli, Squire, Johnson, Hamish Brewer) -  8:58
"City of Dreams" (Nardelli, Squire) - 9:38
"Golden Age" (Nardelli, Squire) - 8:07
"The Promise" (Nardelli, Squire, P. Stacey, Johnson) - 13:26

Personnel
Personnel adapted from Syndestructible liner notes.
The Syn
 Steve Nardelli - lead vocals
 Chris Squire - bass guitar, backing vocals
 Paul Stacey - guitar, backing vocals
 Gerard Johnson - keyboards, backing vocals
 Jeremy Stacey - drums

Production 
 Paul Stacey - production, mixing, engineering
 Gerard Johnson - production
 Chris Harrison - assistant production
 Jamie Selway - assistant production
 Henry Philpotts - assistant production
 Ian Cooper - mastering

References

2004 albums
The Syn albums